Masanori Miyamoto (宮本昌典, Miyamoto Masanori, born 3 February 1997) is a Japanese weightlifter. He won the bronze medal in the men's 73 kg event at the 2020 Asian Weightlifting Championships held in Tashkent, Uzbekistan. He represented Japan at the 2020 Summer Olympics in Tokyo, Japan. He competed in the men's 73 kg event.

In 2018, he competed in the men's 69 kg event at the 2018 Asian Games held in Jakarta, Indonesia.

References

External links 
 

Living people
1997 births
Japanese male weightlifters
Asian Games competitors for Japan
Weightlifters at the 2018 Asian Games
Weightlifters at the 2020 Summer Olympics
Olympic weightlifters of Japan
People from Naha
Sportspeople from Okinawa Prefecture
21st-century Japanese people